Clyde Honeysett Purnell (14 May 1877 – 14 August 1934) was an English amateur footballer who competed in the 1908 Summer Olympics.

Club career
Purnell was born on 14 May 1877 in Ryde, Isle of Wight, the son of John and Emily Purnell. He was an avid sportsman being involved in cycling, cricket, tobogganing, and billiards. He became the captain of the Olympic Sporting Club at the age of 18 (1895). From 1897 to 1902 he was on the winning team in the Lawn Tennis Shield competition. In 1905 he picked up the runners-up medal at Shepherd's Bush in the FA Amateur Cup, but two years later he got gold with Clapton F.C., scoring once in the final in a 6–0 win over Eston United.

International career
Purnell played six matches and netted eight goals for the England amateur team in 1907 and 1908. He was a member of the English amateur team that represented Great Britain at the 1908 Summer Olympics, winning the gold medal in the football tournament. He scored four goals in the first-round match, a 12–1 drubbing of Sweden, which still is Sweden's highest defeat of its history. He also appeared in the final against Denmark, helping his side with a 2-0 win. Purnell scored a further two goals for the amateur side in an unofficial match against Ireland on 7 December 1907 to help his side with a 6–1 win, thus bringing his goal tally to 10 goals.

He was later a Commercial Traveller and died on 19 August 1934 at Folkestone Racecourse leaving a widow and son.

International goals
England Amateurs score listed first, score column indicates score after each Purnell goal.

Notes

References

External links
 
 
 
 Clapton Football Club Heros and Icons

1877 births
1934 deaths
English footballers
English Olympic medallists
England amateur international footballers
Footballers at the 1908 Summer Olympics
Olympic footballers of Great Britain
Olympic gold medallists for Great Britain
Olympic medalists in football
Medalists at the 1908 Summer Olympics
Clapton F.C. players
Association football forwards